90 may refer to: 
 90 (number)
 one of the years 90 BC, AD 90, 1990, 2090, etc.
 90 (album), an album by the electronic music group 808 State
 90 (EP), an album by the band South Club
 Atomic number 90: thorium
 Audi 90, a precursor of the Audi A4 automobile
 Saab 90, a compact executive car

See also
 
 List of highways numbered